Morris "Bucky" Buckwalter (born November 22, 1933) is a former National Basketball Association coach and executive, as well as a former coach in the American Basketball Association.

Buckwalter grew up in La Grande, Oregon, and played high school basketball at La Grande High School. Buckwalter played college basketball at Utah, where his team advanced to the quarterfinals of the 1956 NCAA basketball tournament before losing to the eventual champions, the Bill Russell-led San Francisco Dons.

He served briefly as head coach of the Seattle SuperSonics in 1972 (on an interim basis), and later served as the head coach of the Utah Stars of the ABA, replacing Joe Mullaney.

While with the Stars, Buckwalter was known for signing Moses Malone out of high school.  He was a scout for the Portland Trail Blazers when the team passed on Michael Jordan and selected Kentucky's Sam Bowie as the second pick in the 1984 NBA draft. He served as vice-president of Basketball Operations for the Portland Trail Blazers. In 1991, he won the NBA Executive of the Year Award, as the Blazers posted a league-best 63–19 record. He retired from the Blazers in 1997.

Head coaching record

College

NBA

References

External links

 BasketballReference.com: Bucky Buckwalter

1933 births
Living people
American men's basketball players
Basketball coaches from Oregon
Basketball players from Oregon
College men's basketball head coaches in the United States
People from La Grande, Oregon
Portland Trail Blazers assistant coaches
Portland Trail Blazers executives
Seattle Redhawks men's basketball coaches
Seattle SuperSonics head coaches
Utah Stars coaches
Utah Utes men's basketball players
Western Basketball Association coaches